Herbert Roger Morris (July 16, 1915 – July 22, 2009) was an American rower, born in Seattle, an Olympic gold medallist at Berlin 1936.

Morris had rowed on Puget Sound as a boy and took up sweep-oar rowing at the University of Washington. He rowed in UW senior varsity eights which won US national Intercollegiate Rowing Association titles in 1936 and 1937. At the 1936 Summer Olympics, he won the gold medal rowing in the bow seat of the American boat in the men's eight competition.

Morris was a mechanical engineering graduate. In his professional career he worked on large scale dredging projects in the Seattle area.

References

External links
 profile

1915 births
2009 deaths
Rowers from Seattle
American male rowers
Rowers at the 1936 Summer Olympics
Olympic gold medalists for the United States in rowing
University of Washington alumni
Medalists at the 1936 Summer Olympics